Organotellurium chemistry describes the synthesis and properties of chemical compounds containing a carbon-tellurium chemical bond. Organotellurium chemistry is a lightly studied area, in part because of the few applications.

Functional groups
The Te analogues of common organosulfur and organoselenium functional groups are known.  Tellurols are however unstable with respect to oxidation to the ditellurides.  Commonly encountered organotellurium compounds are diorganomono- and ditellurides, R2Te and (RTe)2, respectively. Two other families of organoTe(IV) compounds are well developed: R4−xTeClx and the telluroxides (R2TeO).

Synthesis and reactions

Reduced organoTe compounds
Reduced organoTe compounds are commonly obtained from NaHTe and lithium telluride:  
Li2Te + 2 RBr → R2Te + 2 LiBr
A direct route to organolithium compounds starts from reactions of organolithium or Grignard reagents and Te:
Te + ArLi → ArTeLi
Butyl lithium gives the telluride similarly:
Te + BuLi → BuTeLi

Organotelluride anions can be oxidized or alkylated:
2 RTeLi + 0.5 O2 + H2O → RTeTeR + 2 LiOH
RTeLi + R'Br → RTeR' + LiBr

Diorganoditellurides are valued intermediates, especially the aryl derivatives such as diphenyl ditelluride:
Ar2Te2 + RLi → RTeAr + LiTeR
Ph2Te2 + 2 Li →  2 LiTePh

Derivatives of TeCl4

One departure from sulfur and selenium chemistry is the availability of the tetrachloride, TeCl4. It reacts with arenes to give aryltellurium trichlorides:
ArH + TeCl4 → ArTeCl3 + HCl
For electron-rich arenes, the disubstitution occurs
ArH + ArTeCl3 →  Ar2TeCl2 → + HCl

Tellurium tetrachloride adds across alkenes and alkynes to the chloro tellurium trichlorides:
RCH=CH2 + TeCl4 → RCH(Cl)-CH2TeCl3

Organotellurium trichlorides adopt dimeric structures, reflecting the Lewis acidity of the Te(IV) center. The dimers are cleaved by halides and other Lewis bases:
RTeCl3 + Cl− → RTeCl4−
The anions RTeCl4− (and the related adducts RTeCl3L) adopt square pyramidal structures with the electronegative groups in the plane.

Organotellurium(IV) chlorides are susceptible to substitution reactions where by chloride is replaced by other halides and pseudohalides.  The TeClx group can also be removed with Raney nickel.

OrganoTe(IV) compounds participate in Stille reactions:

Telluroxides
Telluroxides are generally related to sulfoxides and selenoxides in terms of their structures.  Unlike their lighter analogues however, they polymerize (reversibly) when crystallized. Analogous to selenoxide oxidation, allylic telluroxides undergo [2,3]-sigmatropic rearrangements forming allylic alcohols after hydrolysis. Also analogous to the selenoxide elimination,  certain telluroxides give alkenes upon heating.

Applications
Dimethyl telluride is used to in metalorganic vapour phase epitaxy where it serves as a volatile source of Te.  It is the only organotellurium compound that has been quantified in environmental samples.

References